Rafiganj is a town and a notified area in Aurangabad district in the Indian state of Bihar. It is the district's second-largest town in population after Aurangabad, and also the second-largest town in area. Rafiganj is located 25 km away from the District Administration.

Geography

Rafiganj is located at  It has an average elevation of 89 metres (291 feet). Town is located on the bank of Dhava River.

Demographics

 India census, the town Rafiganj had a population of 35,536 with a literacy rate of 66.8 percent. In Rafiganj, 16.7 percent of the population is between 0 and 6 years of age.

Transportation

Local Transport
City Bus, Auto-Rickshaw, and cycle rickshaw moves here generally to the local transport and 2x2 luxury bus,

Roadways
Regular Bus service is from Rafiganj to Kasma, Aurangabad, Daudnagar, Gaya, Jamshedpur, Hazaribagh, Ramgarh, Ranchi, and Kolkata

Railways

Rafiganj is connected to other towns and cities by railways, facilitated by the Rafiganj Railway Station which serves numerous express and superfast trains. Grand Chord rail-line that connects Howrah and New Delhi passes through Rafiganj. Rafiganj is also connected with the two cities Gaya and Aurangabad and three other towns of the Aurangabad district 'Goh', 'Obra', and 'Daudnagar' through SH-68

Economy
Rafiganj has a market for the local area.

Schools and colleges
 Sanjay Singh Yadav college Rafiganj Aurangabad Bihar 
 Government Engineering College, Aurangabad (Kasma Road,Arthua)
 Shivam Kid'szee School,Rafiganj,Aurangabad.
 Aqsa National Public School, Rafiganj
 Govt Urdu Middle School Quazichak (Urdu Middle school)
 Govt Urdu Middle School, Rampur
 British Academy (private school)
 The Greenview International School , Chaudhary Gali , Rafiganj
 R. B. R. High school
 Ambika Public School
 Buddha Public School
 Saraswati Shishu Mandir (High School)
 St. Ignatius High School
 Government Middle School
 Dr. V. K.Singh College Rafiganj
 High School Karma
 God's Grace Public School, Noniya Tilha, Rafiganj
 Heaven's Blossom Raja Bagicha Rafiganj
 B.L. Indo Anglian Public School, Aurangabad
 Sarswati Shishu Mandir]], Rafiganj
 Mount Carmel School Shikshak Colony Babuganj, Rafiganj
 DAV Public School, located at Kasma Road, Neema Chaturbhuj, Rafiganj
 Sanjay Singh Yadav College Rafiganj
 Dawn Public School, Uchali in Rafiganj
 Tender heart school, Rafiganj
 Lakshyadeep International School, Rafiganj
 Bosco International Public School, Rafiganj
 Bright Life Public School, Rafiganj
 Government middle school rafiganj Dak bungalow  rafiganj
 Government primary school rafiganj
 Government girls high (+2) school rafiganj
 Government girls middle school rafiganj  (1to8)

Entertainment
Local theatres include "Laxmi Talkies" and "Lalita Talkies" where Bollywood, Hollywood and Bhojpuri movies are shown. There is two big grounds in Rafiganj one is RBR Stadium and other is Charwaha Ground for playing cricket and football.

Tourism
Jain Mandir Which Represent A Piece Of Art, Shanti Kunj House Situated In Post Office Gali, Badi Durga Devi Mandir (Devi sthan) is a Hindu temple nearby main road and Rafiganj Police station. Near the railway station, a temple of Dihbar Baba (Dihbar Sthan) And [Shiv Mandir] Near Of R.B.R Kasma Road is a marriage place and tourist destination for the Rafiganj area. Pachar Pahar is a mountain in which the temple of Parashnath is founded which includes a 30 feet painting of Mahavira.

Jama Masjid is a mosque located in the center of the town. It was constructed in 1912. Adjacent to the Jama Masjid there is a Madarsa named Jamea Sharfia which provides education in Urdu Medium. The Madina Masjid mosque is located in Raja Bagicha.
 Mahadeoghat which situated onsouth side of City on the bank of dhawa river .

References

Cities and towns in Aurangabad district, Bihar